Bodas de odio (English title:Weddings of hate) is a Mexican telenovela produced by Ernesto Alonso for Televisa in 1983. Its original story was by Caridad Bravo Adams, adapted by María Zarattini and directed by José Rendón.

Christian Bach, Miguel Palmer and Frank Moro starred as protagonists, while Rosario Gálvez, María Montaño, Antonio Medellín and Rafael Sánchez Navarro starred as main antagonists.

The series won Best Telenovela of the Year at the Premios TVyNovelas in 1984.

Plot
Magdalena Mendoza (Christian Bach) is a young woman who is in love with José Luis (Frank Moro), a humble soldier. Magdalena is forced by her mother Paula to marry Alejandro Almonte (Michael Palmer), a wealthy man, to save the family from the ruin.

Alejandro, meanwhile, is the illegitimate son of a rich man, who recognized him shortly before his death, and reaches Puebla to see the paper mill that he inherited. Paula, seeing just how wealthy Alejandro is, tries to set her daughter with him. She provokes Alejandro's sympathy, telling him about her family problems. When Alejandro finds out about this, and thinks that Magdalena has agreed, he agrees to marry her. He decides to make her life impossible, especially when he finds out she is in love with José Luis. As a way to separate the two, he has the soldier sent to prison. After Alejandro marries Magdalena, José Luis escapes from prison and goes to the mansion of the Mendoza family shortly after the wedding.

Magdalena asks to go with José Luis, but Alejandro learns about this and decides to take Magdalena to his ranch. Living there are Alejandro's true mother Rosario, María, the foreman's daughter who loves Alejandro, and his friends Cipriano and Victor.  Alejandro has liberal ideas and movement supporting the rebels against the regime of Porfirio Díaz. After learning of Magdalena's whereabouts, José Luis began working as a foreman on the ranch. He married Angélica, who has an incurable disease, but in his heart he has always loved Magdalena.

But Magdalena has fallen in love with Alejandro. When Alejandro learns that the new foreman is José Luis, he gets angry. He finds out Magdalena is pregnant shortly afterward, but because he now knows the identity of the foreman, he doubts the baby is his. Angry and heartbroken, Alejandro leaves. During the revolution, he is captured by government troops, and José Luis, knowing he is sacrificing his life for Magdalena, saves him. He has finally given up on the love he thought he had for her. He saves Alejandro to allow them to have their happily ever after.

Cast
 
 Christian Bach as Magdalena Mendoza
 Miguel Palmer as Alejandro Almonte
 Frank Moro as Jose Luis Álvarez
 Rafael Sánchez Navarro as Dimitrio Mendoza
 Magda Guzmán as Carmen Mendoza Vda. de Muñoz
 Rosario Gálvez as Paula de Mendoza
 Yolanda Mérida as Rosario
 Julieta Egurrola as Josefina de Icaza
 Antonio Valencia as Adolfo Chavarri
 Arturo Benavides as Rufino
 María Montaño as María
 Carlos Riquelme as General Iván Mendoza
 José Luis Padilla as Don Porfirio Díaz
 Ofelia Cano as Nadia Chavarri de Torres Quintero
 Silvia Manríquez as Armida
 Antonio Medellín as Francisco Torres Quintero
 José Antonio Ferral as Víctor
 Jorge Mondragón as Father Abundio
 Carlos Villarreal as Tomás
 Fabio Ramírez as Joaquín
 Roberto Antúnez as Cipriano
 Luis Xavier as Felipe
 Arsenio Campos as Marquess Sebastián de la Cruz y Cañizares
 Carmen Cortés as Manuela
 Lupe Silva as Dominga
 Enrique del Castillo as Loreto Mejía
 Patsy as Angélica
 Lizzeta Romo as Esperanza
 Adalberto Parra as Ezequiel
 Alfonso Kafitti as Alfonso
 Miguel Ángel Negrete as Manuel Calderón
 Consuelo Frank as Aunt Prudencia
 Helio Castillos as Juventino
 Nerina Ferrer as Amalia
 Rosa Elena Díaz as Margarita
 Salvador Quiroz
 Rigoberto Carmona
 Mary Carmen Martínez
 Macario Álvarez

Awards

References

External links

1983 telenovelas
Mexican telenovelas
1983 Mexican television series debuts
1984 Mexican television series endings
Spanish-language telenovelas
Television shows set in Puebla
Televisa telenovelas
1960 novels
Mexican novels